Love and Gout is an 1814 comedy play by the British writer Robert Francis Jameson. It was originally staged at the Haymarket Theatre in London's West End. It was considered successful with audiences.

References

Bibliography
 Kozar, Richard & Burling, William J. Summer Theatre in London, 1661-1820, and the Rise of the Haymarket Theatre. Fairleigh Dickinson Univ Press, 2000.
 Nicoll, Allardyce. A History of Early Nineteenth Century Drama 1800-1850. Cambridge University Press, 1930.
 Valladares, Susan.  Staging the Peninsular War: English Theatres 1807-1815. Routledge, 2016.

1814 plays
West End plays
Comedy plays
Plays by Robert Francis Jameson